This list of listed buildings in Læsø Municipality is a list of listed buildings in Læsø Municipality, Denmark.

The list

References

External links
 Danish Agency of Culture

Læsø